Klemmer  may refer to:

 Ulmus × hollandica 'Klemmer' Elm cultivar
 Elbling The German wine grape known as Klemmer

 Klemmer (surname)